Paul Bamber (born 18 March 1961) is a Zimbabwean archer. He competed in the men's individual and team events at the 1988 Summer Olympics.

References

External links
 

1961 births
Living people
Zimbabwean male archers
Olympic archers of Zimbabwe
Archers at the 1988 Summer Olympics
Place of birth missing (living people)